Massimo Morales (born 20 April 1964) is an Italian football manager.

Coaching career
Morales was born in Caserta. He managed 1. FK Příbram from March 2008, and led the Czech team to 2nd place in Czech 2. Liga, thus ensuring promotion back to the national top flight. On 5 May 2009 1. FK Příbram owner Jaroslav Starka and the Italian coach mutually decided to part ways because the club was delaying the payment of the salaries. On 29 October 2009, he was named as the new head coach of Budapest Honvéd, replacing Tibor Sisa. In season 2010, after Újpest FC defeated his team, he resigned.

He later worked for the staff of English team Watford.

In 2019 he was named head coach of Daytona SC.

He successively served as head coach of Brescia Women from June to September 2022.

Career
Coaching career history

References

1964 births
Living people
People from Caserta
Italian football managers
De Graafschap managers
AC Bellinzona managers
Fortuna Düsseldorf managers
SV Waldhof Mannheim managers
FC Bayern Munich non-playing staff
1. FK Příbram managers
Potenza S.C. managers
Budapest Honvéd FC managers
Czech First League managers
Stuttgarter Kickers managers
3. Liga managers
USL League Two coaches
Nemzeti Bajnokság I managers
Italian expatriate football managers
Italian expatriate sportspeople in the Czech Republic
Expatriate football managers in the Czech Republic
Italian expatriate sportspeople in the United States
Expatriate soccer managers in the United States
Italian expatriate sportspeople in Hungary
Expatriate football managers in Hungary
Sportspeople from the Province of Caserta